Elisa Meneghini (born 24 July 1997 in Como) is an Italian artistic gymnast, a member of the Italian national women's artistic gymnastics team, the 2014 Italian champion in all-around, floor exercise and balance beam. As a junior, she won a silver medal in the junior team competition at the 2012 European Championships. She also attended the 2016 Olympic Games in Rio.
She is the first italian gymnast to compete a full twisting back layout on beam (Difficulty G).

She with her teammates Carlotta Ferlito and Sophia Campana was also made famous in Italy by the reality show  that is being aired on MTV Italia.

Career

2015 
At the 2015 City of Jesolo Trophy she won silver with the Italian team (in the team all-around competition). On the balance beam, she finished eighth.

Competitive results

References

External links 
  
 
 
 

1997 births
Living people
Italian female artistic gymnasts
Sportspeople from Como
Participants in Italian reality television series
Gymnasts at the 2016 Summer Olympics
Olympic gymnasts of Italy